Henry James C. Aquino (born May 27, 1977, in Honolulu, Hawaii) is an American politician and a Democratic member of the Hawaii House of Representatives since January 16, 2013 representing District 38. Aquino consecutively served from 2009 until 2013 in the District 35 seat.

Education
Aquino earned his Associate degree from Honolulu Community College, in Bachelor of Arts in public administration from the University of Hawaiʻi – West Oʻahu, and his Master's degree in communication from Hawaii Pacific University.

Elections
2012 Redistricted to District 38, and with Democratic Representative Marilyn Lee redistricted to District 36, Aquino was unopposed for both the August 11, 2012 Democratic Primary, winning with 3,371 votes, and the November 6, 2012 General election.
2004 Aquino initially challenged incumbent Democratic Representative Alex Sonson in the District 35 September 18, 2004 Democratic Primary, but lost; Sonson held the seat until 2009.
2008 When Democratic Representative Alex Sonson ran for Hawaii Senate and left the District 35 seat open, Aquino won the five-way September 20, 2008 Democratic Primary with 2,559 votes (58.6%), and won the November 4, 2008 General election with 5,566 votes (80.7%) against Republican nominee Steven Antonio.
2010 Aquino won the September 18, 2010 Democratic Primary with 2,901 votes (74.5%), and won the November 2, 2010 General election with 4,803 votes (80.5%) against Republican nominee Reginald Yago.

References

External links
Official page at the Hawaii State Legislature
 

1977 births
Living people
Hawaii Pacific University alumni
Hawaii politicians of Filipino descent
Democratic Party members of the Hawaii House of Representatives
Politicians from Honolulu
University of Hawaiʻi – West Oʻahu alumni
21st-century American politicians
Asian-American people in Hawaii politics
American politicians of Filipino descent
Honolulu Community College alumni